In each of the twelve Houses in the Harvard College House system, the Allston Burr Resident Dean (for many decades the Allston Burr Senior Tutor) is an Assistant Dean of the College, responsible for the academic and disciplinary well-being of the undergraduates in that House.
The House's highest official other than the Faculty Dean (until 2016 called the House's Master), the Allston Burr Resident Dean has primary supervision of the House tutors. The Resident Dean assists the Faculty Dean in selecting House tutors. The Resident Deans report to the Dean of the College and sit on the Administrative Board, the College disciplinary body.

An occasional Resident Dean is a junior faculty member, but more typically is an appointed lecturer in the Faculty of Arts and Sciences.  As the name implies, the Resident Dean lives in the House and shares daily meals both with the students in his or her charge and with the Tutors, faculty, and University officials who comprise the House's Senior Common Room.

References
Harvard Office of Residential Life

Harvard University